"Like Mary Warner" is the fifth single by Russian girl group Serebro, released on 24 August 2009 (see 2009 in music). The direct Russian name given to the English version is titled "Как марихуана" (Kak marihuana; Like marijuana). It is the first single to feature lyrics by Anastasia Karpova, and the song was not included on Serebro's debut album Opiumroz. The Russian version, "Сладко" (Sladko; Sweet), topped the Russian Airplay Chart, becoming the band's fourth number one in Russia. Both versions of the song were composed by Maxim Fadeev and the Russian version was written by band member Olga Seryabkina.

Track listing 
Digital Download
(Released on their website)
 "Сладко (Pop Edit)" (Maxim Fadeev, Olga Seryabkina) — 03:56
 "Сладко (Andrei Harchenko Remix)" (Maxim Fadeev, Olga Seryabkina, Andrei Harchenko) — 04:00
 "Like Mary Warner" (Maxim Fadeev) — 03:56

Chart positions

Personnel 
 Anastasia Karpova, Olya Seryabkina, Elena Temnikova — vocals
 Maxim Fadeev — composer

References

External links 
 Official Website of Serebro

2009 singles
Serebro songs
Songs written by Maxim Fadeev
2009 songs
Songs written by Olga Seryabkina